Huayno (Waynu in Quechua) is a genre of popular Andean music and dance. It is especially common in Peru, Bolivia, Northern Argentina and Northern Chile, and is practiced by a variety of ethnic groups, especially the Quechua people. The history of Huayno dates back to colonial Peru as a combination of traditional rural folk music and popular urban dance music. High-pitched vocals are accompanied by a variety of instruments, including quena (flute), harp, siku (panpipe), accordion, saxophone, charango, lute, violin, guitar, and mandolin. Some elements of huayno originate in the music of the pre-Columbian Andes, especially on the territory of the former Inca Empire. Huayno utilizes a distinctive rhythm in which the first beat is stressed and followed by two short beats.

Subgenres
 Carnaval Ayacuchano, a holiday genre from the Ayacucho Region, Peru
 Hiyawa or hiyaway, a dry-season ritual song and dance from north of Potosí Department, Bolivia

Dance
The dance begins with the man offering his right arm to the women as an invitation for her to dance (there is even a special word for this action,  "to invite woman to dance a wayñu"). Alternatively, he puts his handkerchief on the shoulder of the woman. Next, the partners walk along an enclosure, and finally they dance. The dance consists of an agile and vigorous stamping of the feet during which the man follows the woman, opposite to front, touching her with his shoulders after having turned around, and only occasionally he touches his right arm to the left hand of his partner while both swing to the rhythm of the music. His movements are happy and roguish.

Notable examples
 "Valicha" by Miguel Angel Hurtado
 "Ojos azules" by Manuel Casazola Huancco
 "El Cóndor Pasa" by Daniel Alomía Robles (second part, with high tempo, the first part is harawi)
 "Vírgenes del Sol" by Jorge Bravo de Rueda
 "Adiós pueblo de Ayacucho"
 "Wasimasillay" by José Sanchez Yañac of Los Bohemios del Cusco.

References

External links
Music from the Andes and Nearby Regions

 
Andean music
Peruvian dances
Peruvian styles of music
Peruvian culture
Dance in Argentina
Native American dances
Latin American folk dances